Justin Timberlake: Live from London is the first live video album by American singer-songwriter Justin Timberlake. It was released on December 15, 2003, by Jive Records. It documents Timberlake's performance at the London Arena on May 18, 2003.

Track listing

Chart positions

Certifications

Release history

References 

2003 video albums
Justin Timberlake albums
Albums produced by the Neptunes
Jive Records video albums
Live video albums